For information on all Lamar University sports, see Lamar Cardinals and Lady Cardinals

The 2020–21 Lamar Lady Cardinals basketball team represented Lamar University during the 2020–21 NCAA Division I women's basketball season. The Lady Cardinals, led by second year head coach Aqua Franklin, played their home games at the Montagne Center in Beaumont, Texas as members of the Southland Conference. They finished the season 10–14, 9–6 in Southland play to finish in fourth place. Their season ended with a loss to Central Arkansas in the Southland women's tournament quarter-final round.

This season was the Cardinals' last as members of the Southland Conference. Lamar is one of four schools, all from Texas, that left the Southland in July 2021 to join the Western Athletic Conference.

Previous season
The Lady Cardinals finished the 2019–20 season with an overall record of 10–19. They failed to qualify for the Southland Conference tournament.

Schedule 
Sources:

|-
!colspan=12 style=""| Non-Conference schedule

|-
!colspan=12 style=""|

See also 
2020–21 Lamar Cardinals basketball team

References 

Lamar Lady Cardinals basketball seasons
Lamar
Lamar Lady Cardinals basketball
Lamar Lady Cardinals basketball